The Simplex Red Arrow was a US single-engined monoplane produced in the late 1920s and early 1930s and intended as club machine or mail transport. Most used radial engines in the  range. They carried one or two passengers whose seats could be open or  enclosed. One variant, the Red Arrow Dual Plane, was easily converted from monoplane to biplane and was available with two versions of the much more powerful Wright Whirlwind engines. In all about 20 were built.

Design and development

The Red Arrow was designed by Omer Woodson and was a development of his Woodson M-6, a low power, low wing monoplane powered by a  Detroit Cat engine. They were intended for commercial club use, including training and general flying as well as for mail-carrying, seen as an important profit-earner at the time.

The Kinner-powered Red Arrows had a rectangular plan wing, braced from below with V-struts enclosed in streamlined fairings between a rearward extension of the undercarriage structure and the two wing spars. The engine was mounted with its cylinders exposed for cooling out of a conical metal cowling but behind it the fuselage was a flat-sided steel tube structure. The open cockpit version (K-2-S) had side-by-side seating over mid-wing and the two seat cabin equipped K-2-C had a revised upper fuselage including a long, angular enclosure with forward glazing. The pilot's downward view was severely limited by the wing, so transparent panels in the lower fuselage sides were installed to help him. No images of the three seat cabin  K-3-C are known. All versions had provision for passengers' luggage or mail. The tailplane was mounted on top of the fuselage and braced to a blunted triangular fin that carried a straight-edged unbalanced rudder.

The undercarriage was conventional with mainwheels on semi-split axles, their outer ends on faired vertical legs with rubber chord shock absorbers. Centrally, the axles were hinged together onto a single strut running rearwards to the central fuselage underside. Brakes were an option.

About ten of the Kinner-powered Red Arrows were built.

In 1929 two new Red Arrows were flown. Its wings were braced with pairs of twin, parallel, faired struts to the lower fuselage and its undercarriage had independent legs and drag struts. It received its type certificate in September 1929. About ten, including one K-2-S conversion, were built.

The other, and most unusual, Red Arrow type was the Red Arrow Dual Plane or Simplex Racer, an aircraft capable of rapid conversion between monoplane (fast) and biplane (greater load) configurations. Although rare, a few other such designs were built and flown; the Parnall Pixie III was an earlier, though non-commercial, example from 1924. The Racer had a high upper wing instead of the mid-wing of the earlier Red Arrows but with a similar span and chord, though more tapered towards the tips. They were braced to the lower fuselage by parallel pairs of cross braced struts. When required the shorter span lower wings were attached to the lower fuselage longerons and braced to the upper wing with a pair of N-form interplane struts. It was claimed that mounting or demounting the lower wing took only five minutes.

The open cockpit of the Dual Plane was moved rearward to a position well behind the upper trailing edge. Its landing gear was also altered, with mainwheels on vertical legs from the forward wing struts at points strengthened by horizontal struts to the fuselage and oblique struts to the wings. The bottom end of the legs were joined to the lower fuselage with V-struts. A forward stagger of  allowed the leg to clear the lower leading edge.

The Dual Plane was offered with a choice of two engines, both much more powerful than the Kinner. The biplane configuration was  therefore suited to regular passenger and goods transport, with the monoplane configuration reserved for sports and urgent operations. Alternatively, the biplane could be used as a basic trainer then converted to a monoplane for advanced students.

Operational history

Little is known about the routine service history of the twenty or so Kinner- and Warner-powered aircraft. There were successes at competitive events: a K-2-S was the A-class section winner from a field of 16 in the 1928 Californian air race between Los Angeles and San Francisco.

Variants
Data from: Aerofiles
Note:The alpha-numerical type numbers indicated engine-seats-other characteristics.

Simplex K-2-S Red Arrow 2 seat single open cockpit.

Simplex K-2-C Red Arrow 2 seat enclosed cabin. Together, about 10 K-2s were built.

Simplex K-3-C Red Arrow 3 seat enclosed cabin.

Simplex W-2-S Warner Scarab engine, heavily revised undercarriage and wing struttage. About 10 built, though one was a K-2-S conversion.

Simplex R-2-D Red Arrow Dual Plane or Simplex Racer Easily converted from fast monoplane to a biplane able to carry greater payloads. Choice of two Wright Whirlwind engines. Numerous smaller modifications including cockpit position and undercarriage. One built.

Specifications (Kinner engine)

References

Monoplanes
Single-engined tractor aircraft
1920s United States civil aircraft